Hella Elise Rentema (born 12 April 1950) is a retired Dutch swimmer. She competed at the 1968 Summer Olympics in the 4×100 mm freestyle relay, but her team failed to reach the final.

She married Kees Versfeld and changed her last name to Versfeld. She has a daughter, Kim, and two sons, Niels and Mark, all born in Canada; Mark Versfeld (b. 1976) is a retired Canadian Olympic swimmer. She still competes in masters swimming and triathlon, as well as her husband.

References

1950 births
Living people
Dutch female freestyle swimmers
Olympic swimmers of the Netherlands
Swimmers at the 1968 Summer Olympics
Sportspeople from Groningen (city)
20th-century Dutch women
20th-century Dutch people